Scylla et Glaucus (Scylla and Glaucus) is a tragédie en musique with a prologue and five acts, the only surviving full-length opera by Jean-Marie Leclair. The French-language libretto by d'Albaret is based on Ovid's Metamorphoses, books 10, 13 and 14. It was first performed at the Académie Royale de Musique in Paris on 4 October 1746.

Background
The quality of the vocal writing in Scylla et Glaucus came as a surprise to many, given that Leclair was much better known for composing instrumental music, and therefore had little experience in opera. By the time the Scylla was performed in 1746, Leclair was already known for his forty-eight violin sonatas, his trios, and his concertos. He received much of his musical training in Italy, where he was exposed to the influence of Pietro Locatelli and other Italian composers of the time. This is why the writing of Scylla, while remaining recognizably in French, is full of italianisms.

Leclair dedicated the work to Marie-Anne-Françoise de Noailles, Countess of La Mark (or La Marck), an accomplished musician who sang and played the harpsichord. Madame de La Mark often enjoyed having operas performed in her home.

Roles

Synopsis

Prologue
A temple of Venus where the people of Amathus celebrate a festival in honor of the goddess, the laws to which even the dreaded Mars himself yields. The party is interrupted by Propoetides (the daughters of Propoetus from the city of Amathus on the island of Cyprus), who are jealous of the presence of Venus; they abhor religion and deny the divinity of the goddess. The goddess descends to punish them by way of petrification; "woe to those who despise the pleasures over which she presides". Through her son Amour, she promises happiness and prosperity to those who revere her.

Act 1
The setting is Sicily. On one side, there is a forest, on the other, a vast countryside. The nymph Scylla is equally cold to all of her lovers, including Glaucus, a young prophetic sea-god in Neptune's court, born mortal and turned immortal upon eating a magical herb. It was believed that he commonly came to the rescue of sailors and fishermen in storms, having once been one himself. He is in love with Scylla, and led to despair by the hardness of Scylla's heart, goes to seek help from Circe, the sorceress.

Act 2
Circe is in her palace, and she confesses that she cannot live without love. Inevitably, she goes mad with love for Glaucus when she first sees him. Glaucus asks for assistance in arousing Scylla, but it's for herself that Circe goes to work, devising a spell to make Glaucus fall in love with her instead. A lavish party follows, during which Circe's henchmen attempt to seduce Glaucus. The spell is successful; Glaucus falls at Circe's feet and Scylla is quickly forgotten. A close friend of Glaucus comes to inform him that Scylla complained of his absence, and Scylla's name proves to be enough to break the spell. Glaucus leaves hurriedly to go to his mistress, and Circe, furious, swears revenge.

Act 3
The setting is the edge of the sea. Scylla realizes that despite everything, she is in love with Glaucus. The lovers reunite, which leads, naturally, to a party. Glaucus calls upon all of the sea gods and urges them to sing his victory. The party is disturbed by Circe, who comes down to the scene in a cloud. She ends the act with an anger-filled monologue.

Act 4
The setting is wild, with Mount Etna erupting in the background. Circe makes vain efforts to take back Glaucus. Scylla arrives at the scene, and her presence ignites the jealous wrath of Circe. Circe pretends to be softened by Glaucus's tears, but only to more surely destroy her rival. The moment the two lovers leave, she embarks upon magic incantations to take revenge on Scylla. The Moon descends from heaven, transforms into Hecate, and from out of the Underworld brings to Circe "the most deadly poison that the Phlegethon River has ever produced form its shores". It is the poison that will be the instrument of Circe's vengeance.

Act 5
The setting is a place prepared for party. Glaucus and Scylla exchange tender embraces as well as fears. The memory of Circe concerns Scylla, and Glaucus's only task becomes to reassure his lover. The people of Sicily come to celebrate the anniversary of the liberation of their country, which had for years been subject to the tyrannical empire of the Cyclops. Seeing the fountain Circe poisoned, Glaucus exclaims: "It is in this fountain that I saw your beautiful eyes the first time." Scylla looks into the fountain and the poison takes effect. Scylla succumbs to Circe's cruel revenge and runs into the sea. She dies and turns into a rock in the shape of a woman. Circe triumphs, and she finds satisfaction in Glaucus's misery.

Arias

Performance history
Though the opera was not widely acclaimed, it had a successful eighteen-performance run. The first was on October 4, 1746, at the Académie royale de musique. After the eighth performance, a ballet-pantomime, a genre that was then very popular, was added at the end of the tragedy. It was called Un Jardinier et une Jardinière, or "A Gardener and a Planter". In 1747, Jean-Marie Leclair the Younger, brother of the composer, showed the opera at the Academy of Fine Arts in Lyon, directing the orchestra. It was performed in this same way in 1750 and in 1755.

Modern performances
 London – November 14, 1979 (First revival of the opera)
 Lyon – Opéra Nouvel – February 1986 (First revival in opera in France): Five performances with other performances at the Bath Festival and the Göttingen International Handel Festival
 Versailles – Opéra Royal, September 27 and 29, 2005
 Lyon – Auditorium, December 1, 2005
 Amsterdam – The Royal Concertgebouw, December 3, 2005
 Budapest – Béla Bartók National Concert Hall, May 16, 2013
 Kiel – Ballet Kiel, May 6, 2017
Scylla is not very widely known today and, for that reason, is rarely performed. Neal Zaslaw, an American musicologist, attributes its lack of revival to three specific aspects of the opera: Hecate's terrifying magic powers, a "thoroughly Baroque" musical style, and a tragic ending, viz. the petrification of the heroine and the desolation of the hero.

Form
The opera is cast in the traditional tragédie en musique form developed by Jean-Baptiste Lully in the seventeenth century: a prologue followed by five acts. By the time Scyllas first performance was given, the form was already becoming outdated, threatened by both the newly evolving form of opéra-ballet and the increasingly popular Italian comic opera. However, while the form of the opera might have been old-fashioned, the music was not.

Recordings
 Scylla et Glaucus, Donna Brown (Scylla), Howard Crook (Glaucus), Rachel Yakar (Circé), Monteverdi Choir and English Baroque Soloists conducted by John Eliot Gardiner (3 CDs, Erato, 1988)
 Scylla et Glaucus, Emöke Barath (Scylla), Anders J. Dahlin (Glaucus), Caroline Mutel (Circé), Les Nouveaux Caractères conducted by Sébastien d'Hérin (3 CDs, Alpha, 2015)

Notes and referencesNotesReferences'''

Further reading
 Original libretto at Gallica, Bibliothèque Nationale de France 
 Original printed score at Gallica, Bibliothèque Nationale de France 
 
 
 
 
 Pitou, Spire, The Paris Opéra. An Encyclopedia of Operas, Ballets, Composers, and Performers – Rococo and Romantic, 1715–1815, Greenwood Press, Westport/London, 1985
 
 Sadler, Graham (1992), "Scylla et Glaucus" in The New Grove Dictionary of Opera, ed. Stanley Sadie (London) 
 
 Viking Opera Guide'' (ed. Holden, 1993)
 
 

Operas by Jean-Marie Leclair
French-language operas
Tragédies en musique
Operas based on Metamorphoses
Operas
1746 operas